{{Infobox album
| name       = Modern Girls
| type       = Soundtrack
| longtype   = from the film Modern Girls
| artist     = Various Artists
| cover      = Moderngirls.jpg
| alt        =
| released   = 1986
| recorded   = 1985-1986
| venue      = Various
| studio     = Various
| genre      = Soundtrack, Electronic, Rock
| length     =
| label      = Warner Bros.
| producer   = Various
| prev_title =
| prev_year  =
| next_title =
| next_year  =
}}Modern Girls'' is a soundtrack album to the film of the same name, released in 1986 on Warner Bros.

Track listing
 Depeche Mode: "But Not Tonight" (Robert Margouleff Remix) 
 Anthony and the Camp: "How Many Lovers" 
 Floy Joy: "Weak In The Presence of Beauty"
 Female Body Inspectors: "The Girl Pulled A Dog"
 Toni Basil: "Girls Night Out"
 George Black: "Concentration Breakdown"
 Club Nouveau: "Jealousy"
 Icehouse: "No Promises"
 TKA: "One Way Love"
 The Jesus and Mary Chain: "Some Candy Talking"

Additional music
Other music, used in the film, did not appear on the soundtrack album:

 "Bond of Addiction" - Scott Rogness
 "Safare" - Scott Rogness
 "Game I Can't Win" - Dennis Quaid
 "Something Inside Me Has Died" - Kommunity FK
 "Passion" - Lions & Ghosts
 "Love Changes" - Jackie Warren
 "Eyes of Fire" - Chris Nash
 "Everywhere I Go" - The Call
 "Roof's On Fire" - The Band of Blacky Ranchette
 "Iko Iko" - The Belle Stars
 "Angels In The Night" - France Joli
 "Dont Think Twice" - France Joli
 "Dancin" - Chris Isaak

Release history

References

 [ Modern Girls] at Allmusic
 Modern Girls movie website

1986 soundtrack albums
Warner Records soundtracks
Pop soundtracks
Rock soundtracks
Comedy film soundtracks